The International School of Zanzibar is a private international school located on the island of Zanzibar, Tanzania. , the School educated students from over 29 countries, aged from 2 to 19 years, from pre-kindergarten, to Year 13. The official language, and language of instruction of the school is English. The academic programs are IPC, Cambridge International Lower Secondary, International General Certificate of Secondary Education (IGCSE) and Cambridge International AS/A-Level. Established in 1988, in 2018 there were approximately 200 students enrolled in the school.

The school is located in East Africa, Tanzania, Zanzibar, in the Mazizini area which is 5 minutes from the airport and 10 minutes from Stone Town.

History 
The International School of Zanzibar was founded by parents from foreign countries as a play area for their children. It is a community school catering to both local and foreign families, especially those interested in the Cambridge International curriculum.

Curriculum 
In principle the International School of Zanzibar follows the British National Curriculum including the administration of IGCSEs and AS/A-Level exams (the school is an accredited Cambridge Examination Centre that also accepts private candidates). Included in the curriculum are English, mathematics, science, history, geography, information technology, Swahili language, French language, music, physical education & swimming.

More information 
The school has grown from 10 children in 1988 to over 200 in October 2015. In 2021 the school graduated its first Year 13 class, and those students have gone on to study in the UK, Switzerland, and Tanzania. The school amenities include a swimming pool, science lab, tennis court, football field, art room, and an ICT (Information and Communication Technology) lab. The school has wide range of teachers from around the world, such as Zanzibar, mainland Tanzania, United States, United Kingdom, Belgium, and South Africa.

The school has an International student body enrolling students throughout the age ranges, representing 29 different countries. These include Tanzanian (46%), Germany (7%), the United Kingdom (6%), Italian (5%), Egyptian (4%), Finnish (3%), and Spanish (3%). The remaining 27% of the student population come from 22 other nations.

References

Education in Zanzibar
Cambridge schools in Tanzania
International schools in Tanzania